Grigory Ivanovich Villamov (8 January 1773 – 7 February 1842) was the Secretary of State for the IV department of His Imperial Majesty's Own Chancellery, member of the State Council and Active Privy Councillor under Alexander I and Nicholas I.

References

Sources
 Brockhaus and Efron Encyclopedic Dictionary: in 86 volumes (82 volumes and 4 additional). – Saint Petersburg, 1890–1907.

External links
 
 Willamov Grigory Ivanovich

1773 births
1842 deaths
Members of the State Council (Russian Empire)
Recipients of the Order of St. Anna, 1st class
Recipients of the Order of St. Vladimir, 1st class
Recipients of the Order of St. Vladimir, 2nd class